Charles Paul may refer to:

 Charles Paul (composer) (1902–1990), American composer and organist
 Charles Paul (cricketer) (born 1933), Guyanese cricketer
 Charles H. Paul (born 1890), lawyer and judge in Washington state
 Charles Ferguson Paul (1902–1965), United States federal judge
 Charles Kegan Paul (1828–1902), English publisher and author